Alexander Nouri (born 20 August 1979) is a German former footballer and manager. He played professionally for 14 years with Werder Bremen, Seattle Sounders, KFC Uerdingen, VfL Osnabrück, Holstein Kiel and VfB Oldenburg.

Managerial career
In November 2011, Nouri became part of the coaching staff of VfB Oldenburg. He then became manager of the club between 22 April 2013 and 30 June 2014. He managed the last seven matches of the 2012–13 season and finished with a record of three wins, two draws, and two losses. After the following season, Oldenburg finished in third place with a record of 17 wins, nine draws, and eight losses. In July 2014, Nouri became part of the coaching staff at Werder Bremen serving as an intermediary between first team coach Robin Dutt and reserve team coach Viktor Skrypnyk.

On 25 October 2014, Nouri succeeded Skrypnyk as manager of the reserve team while Skrypnyk became manager of the first team after the dismissal of Dutt.

He was appointed as the head coach of the first team of Bundesliga side Werder Bremen on 18 September 2016. After first serving on an interim basis, Nouri was handed the job permanently on 2 October 2016, with his contract running through to the end of the 2016–17 campaign. Under the helm of Nouri, Bremen escaped the relegation battle and went in contention for European football. In May 2017, his contract with the club was extended. On 30 October 2017, Nouri was dismissed by the club.

He was hired by FC Ingolstadt on 24 September 2018. Two months later, he was sacked.

On 11 February 2020, he took over Hertha BSC on an interim basis after his stint as assistant manager under Jürgen Klinsmann. He was replaced by Bruno Labbadia on 9 April 2020.

Personal life
Nouri's father is an Iranian native who was born in the city of Rasht. His mother is German. He is married and has two children, a daughter, Minoo and a son, Ariyan. He is a dual citizen of Germany and Iran.

Managerial record

References

External links

 

1979 births
Living people
Iranian footballers
Iranian football managers
German football managers
German footballers
German expatriate footballers
SV Werder Bremen II players
SV Werder Bremen players
Seattle Sounders (1994–2008) players
KFC Uerdingen 05 players
VfL Osnabrück players
Holstein Kiel players
VfB Oldenburg players
Association football midfielders
German expatriate sportspeople in the United States
German expatriate sportspeople in Greece
Expatriate soccer players in the United States
A-League (1995–2004) players
2. Bundesliga players
3. Liga players
German people of Iranian descent
3. Liga managers
Bundesliga managers
SV Werder Bremen managers
SV Werder Bremen II managers
FC Ingolstadt 04 managers
Hertha BSC managers
Kavala F.C. managers
Sportspeople of Iranian descent
Footballers from Lower Saxony
Holstein Kiel II players
People from Buxtehude
Expatriate football managers in Greece
German expatriate football managers